Acleris braunana is a species of moth of the family Tortricidae. It is found in North America, where it has been recorded from Alberta, British Columbia, Indiana, Maine, Michigan, New Brunswick, New York, Nova Scotia, Oregon, Pennsylvania, Quebec, Saskatchewan, West Virginia and Wisconsin.

The wingspan is about 15 mm. The forewings are deep red-brown or purple-brown with a shading of grey scaling along the inner margin. There is a strong purple-black costal triangle, as well as a faint line of white scaling. The hindwings are pale smoky. Adults have been recorded on wing from March to December.

The larvae feed on Alnus (including Alnus incana, Alnus rubra) and Betula species (including Betula papyrifera).

References

Moths described in 1934
braunana
Moths of North America